Rodolfo Terlizzi (17 October 1896 – 11 July 1971) was an Italian fencer. He won a gold medal in the team foil event at the 1920 Summer Olympics and a silver in the same event at the 1932 Summer Olympics.

References

1896 births
1971 deaths
Italian male fencers
Olympic fencers of Italy
Fencers at the 1920 Summer Olympics
Fencers at the 1932 Summer Olympics
Olympic gold medalists for Italy
Olympic silver medalists for Italy
Olympic medalists in fencing
Sportspeople from Florence
Medalists at the 1920 Summer Olympics
Medalists at the 1932 Summer Olympics